Ilchunaia is an extinct genus of sebecid mesoeucrocodylian. Fossils have been found from the Divisadero Largo Formation of Argentina dating back to the Late Eocene, and a locality in Mendoza, Argentina dating back to the Oligocene. Little material is known from the genus, with only the anterior portion of the skull being present to study (the holotype has since been lost).

Taxonomy 
The placement of Ilchunaia within Sebecosuchidae has been questioned in the past, and many recent phylogenetic analyses have shown the family to be entirely paraphyletic, with members most likely being basal sebecosuchians ancestral to the baurusuchids.

References

External links 
 Ilchunaia in the Paleobiology Database

Sebecids
Eocene crocodylomorphs
Eocene reptiles of South America
Tinguirirican
Divisaderan
Paleogene Argentina
Fossils of Argentina
Fossil taxa described in 1946
Prehistoric pseudosuchian genera